Ozirhincus is a Palearctic genus of gall midges, whose larval stages feed predominantly on the seeds of Asteraceae.

References

Bibliography 

 
 

Cecidomyiinae
Cecidomyiidae genera
Palearctic insects
Taxa named by Camillo Rondani